Peter Mponda (born 4 September 1981) is a retired Malawian association footballer. He played as a central defender and was the captain of the Malawi national team.

In November 2019, he was appointed coach of the Malawi national under-20 football team.

Career statistics

International goals

See also
 List of men's footballers with 100 or more international caps

References

External links

1981 births
Living people
People from Machinga District
Malawian footballers
Malawi international footballers
Malawian expatriate footballers
Malawian expatriate sportspeople in South Africa
Expatriate soccer players in South Africa
Expatriate soccer players in Canada
Expatriate footballers in Zimbabwe
Association football defenders
2010 Africa Cup of Nations players
CAPS United players
Nyasa Big Bullets FC players
Black Leopards F.C. players
Ottawa Wizards players
Santos F.C. (South Africa) players
FIFA Century Club
Malawian expatriate sportspeople in Canada
Malawian expatriate sportspeople in Zimbabwe